Hapalomantis minima is a species of praying mantis in the family Nanomantidae. This mantis is native to Africa but according to a 1998 paper it "must be deleted from the list of the Mantodea known from Angola".

References

Mantodea of Africa
Insects described in 1906